Rohit Gore is an Indian IT specialist and author who writes novels on various genres.

Personal life
Rohit Gore grew up in the towns of Mumbai and has lived in London. Gore received an MBA from S. P. Jain Institute of Management and Research.

Career
Gore has been in the IT industry for more than ten years. When he was younger he wanted to be "a theatre actor, an architect and a bookshop owner."

His first book, Focus Sam, was reviewed in the Hindustan Times in May 2011. His second book, The Darker Dawn,<ref>"A Darker Dawn explores the darkness in you"Mumbai Mirror</ref> was published in 2011. His third book, Circle of Three (13 August 2012), sold more than 10,000 copies as of July 2013."Tales of an Author" , Pune Mirror His latest release, The Guardian Angels, was published by Grapevine India on 10 July 2013."Guardian Angels – Were They Lovers Or Protectors?" , The Lucknow Tribute

WorksFocus Sam (2011)The Darker Dawn (2011)Circle of Three (2012)The Guardian Angels'' (2013)

References

1977 births
Living people
Indian male novelists